Diospyros coriacea is a tree in the family Ebenaceae. The twigs dry blackish. Inflorescences bear up to seven flowers. The specific epithet  is from the Latin meaning "leathery", referring to the leaves. D. coriacea is found in Singapore and Borneo.

References

coriacea
Plants described in 1873
Trees of Singapore
Trees of Borneo